Scott Reast Copeland (born December 15, 1987) is an American former professional baseball pitcher. He made his Major League Baseball (MLB) debut with the Toronto Blue Jays in 2015, and has also played for the New York Mets in MLB and the  LG Twins of the KBO League.

Professional career

Minor league career
Copeland attended White Oak High School in White Oak, Texas.

Baltimore Orioles
He then attended the University of Southern Mississippi, and was drafted by the Baltimore Orioles in the 21st round of the 2010 Major League Baseball Draft. Copeland played the 2010 season with the Aberdeen IronBirds and Delmarva Shorebirds, and totalled a 3–5 win–loss record, 2.66 earned run average (ERA), and 53 strikeouts in 71 innings pitched. Copeland began the 2011 season in Delmarva, and later earned a promotion to the Advanced-A Frederick Keys. In 141 innings pitched, he posted an 8–11 record, 5.53 ERA, and 77 strikeouts. Copeland made 18 starts with the Keys in 2012, posting a 3–8 record with a 6.88 ERA before being released by Baltimore.

Toronto Blue Jays
He would be signed by the Blue Jays organization shortly afterward, and pitched with the Dunedin Blue Jays for the rest of the season. In 36 innings with Dunedin, Copeland posted a 4–1 record and a 2.70 ERA.

Copeland opened the 2014 season with the Double-A New Hampshire Fisher Cats, and earned a late promotion to the Triple-A Buffalo Bisons. In total, he pitched to an 11–9 record, 3.45 ERA, and 105 strikeouts in 164 innings. In the offseason he played for the Estrellas de Oriente of the Dominican Winter League, posting a 2–0 record and a 1.23 ERA in 29 innings. Copeland opened the 2015 season in Triple-A, and earned a 2–1 record with a 1.44 ERA through his first 4 starts.

Following a Blue Jays loss on May 1, 2015, Copeland was called up for the first time, replacing Andrew Albers on the roster. He made his debut on May 2, pitching 1 scoreless inning in an 11–4 win against the Cleveland Indians. Copeland was optioned back to Triple-A Buffalo the following day, recalled on May 18, and returned to Buffalo on May 29. He was recalled by Toronto again on June 2 to be the 26th man for the second game of a doubleheader against the Washington Nationals, and was returned to Buffalo the next day. Copeland was recalled once again on June 10, to make his first major league start in place of Aaron Sanchez.
He earned his first win as the Blue Jays beat the Miami Marlins 7–2. Copeland pitched 7 innings and yielded 7 hits and 1 earned run, while striking out 4. He was optioned back to Buffalo after the game. He was recalled on June 16, after Sanchez was placed on the disabled list, and made 2 additional starts for the Blue Jays before returning to Buffalo. He was designated for assignment on September 13, and outrighted to Buffalo on September 16. Copeland finished his first Major League season with a 1–1 record, 6.46 ERA, and 6 strikeouts in 15 innings pitched.

Copeland elected free agency on November 6, 2015, but was re-signed to a minor league contract by the Blue Jays on December 18, that included an invitation to spring training. Copeland was reassigned to minor league camp on March 12.

LG Twins
On April 9, 2016, Copeland's contract was sold to the LG Twins of the KBO League for an undisclosed transfer fee. The Twins then signed him to a one-year, $750,000 contract. After 13 starts, he was waived and released on July 8, 2016, and replaced on the Twins' roster by another former major league pitcher, David Huff.

Return to Toronto
On July 24, Copeland signed a minor league contract with the Toronto Blue Jays, and was assigned to the Triple-A Buffalo Bisons. He made nine starts for the Bisons, going 3–4 with a 3.04 ERA and 33 strikeouts in 50 innings.

Miami Marlins
During the 2016 offseason, Copeland signed a minor league contract with the Miami Marlins. On April 14, 2017, while pitching for the Triple-A New Orleans Baby Cakes, Copeland pitched the first 7 innings of a combined no-hitter against the Iowa Cubs, with Hunter Cervenka pitching the 8th inning, and Brandon Cunniff pitching a perfect ninth. He elected free agency on November 6, 2017.

Somerset Patriots
On March 30, 2018, Copeland signed with the Somerset Patriots of the independent Atlantic League of Professional Baseball.

New York Mets
Copeland signed a minor league contract with the New York Mets on April 17, 2018. He was called up by the Mets on May 30, and designated for assignment on June 1. He cleared waivers and was assigned to the Double-A Binghamton Rumble Ponies. He elected free agency on October 2, 2018.

Washington Nationals
On December 30, 2018, Copeland signed a minor league contract with the Washington Nationals. He became a free agent following the 2019 season.

References

External links

1987 births
Living people
Aberdeen IronBirds players
American expatriate baseball players in Canada
American expatriate baseball players in South Korea
Baseball players from Texas
Binghamton Rumble Ponies players
Buffalo Bisons (minor league) players
Delmarva Shorebirds players
Dunedin Blue Jays players
Estrellas Orientales players
American expatriate baseball players in the Dominican Republic
Frederick Keys players
Fresno Grizzlies players
Las Vegas 51s players
LG Twins players
Major League Baseball pitchers
New Hampshire Fisher Cats players
New Orleans Baby Cakes players
New York Mets players
People from Longview, Texas
Somerset Patriots players
Southern Miss Golden Eagles baseball players
Toronto Blue Jays players